RGIT Australia trading as Royal Greenhill Institute of Technology (RGIT) Australia (National Provider No.: 22088 | CRICOS Code: 03002G) is a Private Registered Training Organisation (RTO) accredited by the National Regulator - Australian Skills Quality Authority (ASQA). It is located in Melbourne CBD, Victoria, Australia. In 2014, a second campus was established in Hobart Tasmania. They offer vocational courses in Business and Management, English, Health Sciences, Hospitality, Nursing and Information Technology. A wide selection of study options are offered from short courses, apprenticeships, traineeships, certificates, diplomas, advanced diplomas and Graduate Certificate to Graduate Diploma under the Australian Qualifications Framework.

Campus 
RGIT has 3 campuses in total, two of which are located in Melbourne, Victoria,  and one located in Hobart, Tasmania. 
 

The main campus site is housed in an Australian Natives Association building and is also a Pokestop.

Students are provided the following facilities:
 Fully equipped training kitchens
 Classrooms
 Computer rooms including dedicated facilities for students undertaking Information Technology studies
 Barista room
 Student resource centers
 Free wireless internet

The Melbourne campuses are also close to Flinders Station and restaurants, bars and food outlets.

The Hobart campus classrooms have views of Mount Wellington and Hobart surrounds.

Courses

Certificate and Diploma Courses 
RGIT offers a variety of Certificate, Diploma and Advanced Diploma courses across the following departments:

Short courses 
Short courses are offered in a variety of areas including: Barista, Latte Art, First Aid, Food Safety (1 and 2) and Responsible Service of Alcohol.

The courses range from four to eight hours and can be completed within a day.

Student life

Student body 
The campuses consist of both local and international students. The international students are from 47 different countries and speak around 50 different languages.

RGIT provides on-campus activities such as Open Day, publications, giveaways, graduations, resources and support to all students at all campuses.

References

External links 
 Royal Greenhill Institute of Technology (RGIT), RGIT Australia - Melbourne Campus
 RGIT Australia - Hobart Campus 
 RCAC website 
 RGIT Australia 
 Royal Greenhill Institute Hobart College
 RGIT Melbourne

Organisations based in Melbourne
Education in Tasmania
Education in Victoria (Australia)
Education in Melbourne